Nord Anglia Chinese International School Shanghai (NACIS) is a bilingual school in Shanghai, China. The school opened in 2016.

Campus and location
The school started in 2016, with a campus building in Huacao Town, Minhang District.

References

External links

 NACIS Shanghai Website

International schools in Shanghai
2016 establishments in China
Educational institutions established in 2016
Nord Anglia Education